Thomas Pierpoint (15 September 1789 – 12 June 1849) was an English professional cricketer who played first-class cricket from 1827 to 1833.  He was mainly associated with Sussex and made 9 known appearances in first-class matches.

References

1789 births
1849 deaths
English cricketers
English cricketers of 1826 to 1863
Sussex cricketers
People from Lindfield, West Sussex
Left-Handed v Right-Handed cricketers